This is a list of political appointments of current officeholders made by the 45th president of the United States, Donald Trump.

Links to lists of announced positions from which candidates have withdrawn or appointees who have resigned or have been terminated, as well as lists of appointments to other independent agencies and of holdovers from previous administrations are below.

Following President Trump's election, there were around 4,000 political appointment positions which the incoming Trump administration needed to review, and fill or confirm, of which 1,212 required Senate confirmation. The Washington Post has identified 757 key positions requiring U.S. Senate confirmation. , 531 of Trump's nominees for key positions had been confirmed, 97 were awaiting confirmation, and 13 had been announced but not yet formally nominated, a total of 639 positions. Trump has said he intends not to fill many of the positions. The rules of the Senate require that when the term of the Senate expires (in the case of the 115th Congress, at noon on January 3, 2019), nominations then pending lapse and are returned to the president, who can resubmit them to the new Congress.

All members of the Cabinet require confirmation by the United States Senate following nomination by the president prior to taking office. The vice presidency is exceptional in that the position requires election to office pursuant to the United States Constitution. Although some positions are of Cabinet-level rank, non-cabinet members within the Executive Office of the President, such as White House chief of staff, national security advisor, and White House press secretary, do not hold constitutionally created positions and most do not require Senate confirmation for appointment. Persons appointed on an acting basis do not require Senate confirmation before they begin to act in their position, even if a permanent appointment to that position would require confirmation. Appointments to judgeships on federal courts and of ambassadors require nomination by the president and confirmation by the Senate. Acting appointments to these positions are not permissible.

Analysis 
Certain news organizations, such as Politico and Newsweek, called Trump's incomplete cabinet a "conservative dream team" or "the most conservative cabinet [in United States history]". On the other hand, The Wall Street Journal stated that "it's nearly impossible to identify a clear ideological bent in the incoming president's" cabinet nominations. The Wall Street Journal also stated that Trump's nominations signaled a pro-deregulation administration policy.

Among Donald Trump's appointments there have been several former Goldman Sachs employees, such as Steven Mnuchin, Steven Bannon, and Gary Cohn, as well as several generals, such as Michael T. Flynn, James Mattis, and John F. Kelly. These appointments have generated some criticism, including allegations of violations of the principle of civilian control of the military and allegations of regulatory capture. The Democratic senator from Missouri, Claire McCaskill, has criticized Donald Trump's cabinet stating; "I call it the three 'G' Cabinet: Goldman, generals and gazillionaires."

On January 18, 2017, two days before Trump's inauguration, it was reported that Trump had by then nominated only 28 people to fill 690 positions requiring Senate confirmation. In particular, there had been no nominations below the Cabinet level for the departments of State or Defense, and the staff for the National Security Council was incomplete, while none of the NSC leadership had any NSC experience.

On February 28, 2017, Trump announced he did not intend on filling many of the numerous governmental positions that were still vacant, as he considered them unnecessary. According to CNN on February 25, there were nearly 2,000 vacant government positions.

Color key

Executive Office of the President

Department of Agriculture

Department of Commerce

Department of Defense

Department of Education

Department of Energy

Department of Health and Human Services

Department of Homeland Security

Department of Housing and Urban Development

Department of the Interior

Department of Justice

Department of Labor

Department of State

Department of Transportation

Department of the Treasury

Department of Veterans Affairs

Independent intelligence agencies

Office of the Director of National Intelligence

Central Intelligence Agency

Other independent agencies

Environmental Protection Agency

Small Business Administration

Federal Reserve System

NASA

Independent banks

Independent boards

Independent commissions

Independent committees

Independent councils

Independent offices

Independent miscellaneous

Appointees who have resigned or have been dismissed

Announced positions from which candidates have withdrawn

Pace of appointments and approvals
While President Trump tweeted on February 7, 2017, dissatisfaction – "It is a disgrace my Cabinet is not yet in place, the longest such delay in the history of our country"—the assertion was ruled false by the BBC based on a detailed review of the last five administrations. The analysis found more room for a general complaint of slowness in congressional action and that the administration "has by far the fewest confirmed cabinet selections at this point" but it also noted that, beyond the non-action on Judge Merrick Garland's 10-month nomination to the Supreme Court by Trump's predecessor, President Obama's "choice for Labor secretary, Thomas Perez, took 121 days to be confirmed. John Bryson, his commerce pick, waited 126 days. Attorney General Loretta Lynch holds the modern record, as 161 days passed before getting Senate approval."

In an update on the March 2017 nomination of J. Christopher Giancarlo to the CFTC, the White House submitted his paperwork to the Senate committee in early May. "The paperwork is a prerequisite for the panel to advance the nomination with a hearing and an eventual committee vote, which now may not come until the summer or fall. The committee is said to be waiting for the administration to nominate individuals to fill two more vacancies at the commission before it holds the hearing, according to Senate aides and people familiar with the process," reported the Wall Street Journal.

In July 2017, the New York Times assessed the pace and reported that Trump had announced 36 percent of "leadership positions below the secretary level" compared with 78 percent by Obama over the same period. Average approval time has been nine days slower for Trump appointees versus Obama's. Ten of 15 Cabinet agencies had no number two, several deputy secretaries were not nominated until after the Administration's 100-day mark, and some had not yet been nominated.

By October 2017, Trump had made 412 nominations. By the same point in their respective presidencies, George W. Bush had made 640 nominations and Barack Obama had made 536 nominations.

In May 2018, assessing the administration's overall personnel approach, Evan Osnos reported in The New Yorker that "more than half of the six hundred and fifty-six most critical positions are still unfilled." He quoted Max Stier of the Partnership for Public Service as saying "We've never seen vacancies at this scale[.] Not anything close."

Appointment controversies
A number of appointments had some links to Anti muslim history's such as Since 2017 several people with ties to the Center for Security Policy CSP have joined the Trump administration, including Counselor to the President Kellyanne Conway in 2017, chief of staff for the National Security Council Fred Fleitz in 2018, and Deputy National Security Advisor Charles Kupperman in 2019. Kupperman served on the board of directors for CSP between 2001 and 2010.

The Trump administration used reports released by the CSP when it proposed to ban all Muslims from entering the United States.

Anthony Tata the Under Secretary of Defense for Policy before his term. In Twitter posts and radio-show appearances in 2017 and 2018, Tata repeatedly made the false claim that President Barack Obama was a "Muslim" and a "terrorist leader"; accused Obama of being "an anti-Semite" who wanted to "destroy Israel" and "did not want" to defeat ISIL; and claimed that the negotiation of the multilateral nuclear agreement with Iran was born by Obama's "Islamic roots".

Pete Hoekstra the United States Ambassador to the Netherlands before his term, made claims in November 2015 at a panel titled "Muslim Migration into Europe: Eurabia come True?" hosted by the David Horowitz Freedom Center that the Netherlands had "no-go zones" and that politicians and cars were being set on fire in the country due to radical Islam.

In 2020, President Donald Trump proposed Douglas Macgregor as ambassador to Germany, but the Senate blocked the nomination. In the past he made comments that disparaged immigrants and refugees, called for martial law at US-Mexico border.

See also 
 Republican National Committee chairmanship election, 2017 for the national leadership of Trump's political party
 Donald Trump Supreme Court candidates for the judicial nominees to fill the vacancies formerly held by Antonin Scalia, Anthony Kennedy and Ruth Bader Ginsburg
 Cabinet of Donald Trump, for the vetting process undergone by top-level roles including advice and consent by the Senate
 Sr. Advisor to the President, the role formerly held by Karl Rove under George W. Bush, then by Valerie Jarrett/David Axelrod/etc. under Barack Obama
 List of executive branch 'czars' e.g. Special Advisor to the President
 List of economic advisors to Donald Trump, concentrating on the informal advisors that are not officially part of the Trump administration
 List of federal judges appointed by Donald Trump
 List of short-tenure Donald Trump political appointments
 List of Trump administration appointees who endorsed Joe Biden
 The Fifth Risk - book documenting political appointments at the beginning of the Trump presidency
 Schedule F appointment - aborted Trump plan for reclassifying civil servants as political appointees

References 

+
2010s politics-related lists
Lists of political office-holders in the United States
21st-century American politicians
 Political Appointments